Colton is a male given name, and may refer to:

Colton Avery (born 1991), American singer and songwriter 
Colton Dixon (born 1991), American singer
Colton Dunn (born 1977), American comedian, actor, writer, and producer
Colton Gillies (born 1989), Canadian ice hockey player
Colton Greene (1833–1900), American general 
Colton Harris-Moore (born 1991), American fugitive
Colton Haynes (born 1988), American model and actor
Colton Herta (born 2000), American racing driver
Colton Iverson (born 1989), American basketball player for Maccabi Tel Aviv of the Israeli Basketball Premier League
Colton Jacobson (born 1997), American singer 
Colton McKivitz (born 1996), American football player
Colton Murray (born 1990), American baseball player
Colton Orr (born 1982), Canadian ice hockey player
Colton Parayko (born 1993), Canadian ice hockey player
Colton Sceviour (born 1989), Canadian ice hockey player
Colton Schmidt (born 1990), American football player
Colton Smith (born 1987), American mixed martial artist

See also
Colten, given name
Kolton, given name and surname

English masculine given names